Arpichaya Yubol (born 3 May 2002) is a Thai professional golfer.

Early life 
Yubol was born on 3 May 2002 in Saraburi, Thailand.

Professional career 
Yubol turned professional in 2017 at aged 15. In 2018, she won five titles in a row on the Thai LPGA Tour and won season-long Order of Merit at aged 16.

In July 2022, Yubol won the Trust Golf Links Series at Musselburgh Golf Club on the LET Access Series by five shots.

In December 2022, Yubol earned her card for the 2023 LPGA Tour through qualifying school.

Amateur wins 
2017 Singapore Junior Championship

Source:

Professional wins (12)

LET Access Series wins (1)

Taiwan LPGA Tour wins (1) 
2019 (1) ICTSI Manila Golf Ladies Masters

Thai LPGA Tour wins (8) 
2018 (5) 4th Singha-SAT Thai LPGA Championship, 5th Singha-SAT Thai LPGA Championship, 6th Singha-SAT Thai LPGA Championship, 7th Singha-SAT Thai LPGA Championship, 8th Singha-SAT Thai LPGA Championship
2019 (1) 3rd Singha-SAT Thai LPGA Championship
2021 (2) Singha-BGC 7th Thai LPGA Championship, Singha-BGC 8th Thai LPGA Championship

Other wins (2)
2021 (1) Thailand Mixed #1
2022 (1) 8th SAT-TWT Open Road to World Ranking

References

External links 
 
 

Arpichaya Yubol
LPGA Tour golfers
Arpichaya Yubol
2002 births
Living people
Arpichaya Yubol